Justin Huang (born 6 November 1959) is a Taiwanese politician. Like his father Huang Ching-fong, Justin Huang joined the Kuomintang. He was a member of the National Assembly from 1996 to 2000. Huang was first elected to the Legislative Yuan in 2001. He served two full terms on the Legislative Yuan, and was reelected to a third in 2008. Huang stepped as a legislator in 2009 to run for Taitung County Magistrate. After two terms as county magistrate, Huang left office in 2018.

Education
Huang obtained his bachelor's degree from the Department of International Trade of National Chengchi University. In 1981 he left Taiwan to study at Santa Clara University in the United States, where he completed a Master of Business Administration.

National Assembly
On 23 March 1996, Huang ran for the 1996 Republic of China National Assembly election for Taitung County Constituency in which he and two other Kuomintang (KMT) candidates won and took office on 20 May 1996.

Legislative Yuan

2001 legislative election
On 1 December 2001, Huang ran for the 2001 Republic of China legislative election for Taitung County Constituency in which he won and took office on 1 February 2002 succeeding legislator Hsu Ching-yuan.

2004 legislative election
On 11 December 2004, Huang ran for the 2004 Republic of China legislative election for Taitung County Constituency in which he won again and took office on 1 February 2005.

2008 legislative election
On 12 January 2008, Huang ran for the 2008 Republic of China legislative election for Taitung County Constituency in which he won again.

Taitung County Magistrate

2009 local election
Huang was elected Magistrate of Taitung County after winning the 2009 Republic of China local election under the Kuomintang on 5 December 2009 and assumed office on 20 December 2009. Due to this winning, he had to release his seat as legislator at the Legislative Yuan of Taitung County Constituency. He was succeeded by Lai Kun-cheng (賴坤成) of the Democratic Progressive Party.

2014 local election
He was reelected for a second term in 2014 after winning the 2014 Republic of China local election on 29 November 2014 and took office on 25 December the same year.

Administration goals 
In his 'Governor's Column', Justin Huang vowed to “Clean up corruption" in Taitung politics,  and “Listen to the people... not lazy bureaucrats” in order to create jobs through development. In his autobiography Huang reflected: “Taitung is the first and only county to have passed the Taitung Autonomous Landscape Regulations Management Act which aims to protect the environment and develop local construction at the same time." The centrepiece of this was a new resort district along the coastal countryside of Taitung.

Huang made 18 trips to Mainland China to promote Taitung as a potential high-volume tourism resource. He promised to “Allow tour buses to freely travel”, while at the same time “Develop culture” and “Support indigenous youth”.

Popularity 
Justin Huang received generally high popularity rankings while serving as Taitung Magistrate although discrepancies between different polls are evident. Whereas Global Views Monthly polls described Justin Huang and Hualien Magistrate Fu Kun-chi as “regulars in the ‘five-star club’”   during the same period (2015-16), Huang ranked 10th and 8th out of 13 county magistrates in CommonWealth Magazine polls. 
In the 2018 CommonWealth poll, “Justin Huang (黃健庭) ... ranked second, followed by then-Hualien County commissioner (magistrate) Fu Kun-chi (傅崐萁)”

Achievements as Magistrate 
During his two terms as County Magistrate, Huang lists his achievements as overseeing the introduction of the Taiwan International Balloon Festival (臺灣國際熱氣球間年華) and the Taitung Open of Surfing, redeveloping the Taitung Station while building a shopping mall and movie theater at the site of the old Taitung train station, pushing for the Puyuma express train to Taitung, and resolving the Taitung incinerator crisis.

Pharmaceutical corruption charges
In 2008, Huang was indicted on charges about accepting bribes or using his position as legislator in relation to the Lotus (美時公司), Fisherman (派頓製藥公司), and I Sheng Pharmaceutical companies (羿盛公司) in 2004 and 2005, respectively. Huang denied the accusations. He was found guilty of violating the Accountancy Act with regard to processing payments from Lotus Pharmaceutical proxies through his charity foundations, and not guilty on all counts of corruption in 2016. He was sentenced to a combined 10 months of jail, later reduced into a fine due to the application of the 'Speedy Trial Act'.

Nomination for Control Yuan 
On 20 June 2020, it was reported that Justin Huang had been President Tsai’s nomination to become vice-President of the Control Yuan - an oversight branch of government that monitors and conducts investigations into the activities of the other branches.  Huang’s Taitung County government was itself investigated and censured over its handling of the Miramar Resort. 

However, a press conference scheduled to announce the nominations on 19 June was indefinitely canceled due to bipartisan criticism of the decision. Huang’s own party, the KMT, threatened to expel him for accepting a DPP nomination without prior consultation, while several DPP legislatures voiced concerns, including Lin Shu-fen (林淑芬), who wrote: “It is incomprehensible that the proposed nominee for vice president is someone who has been convicted of corruption, and helped a business push through the controversial development of the Taitung Miramar Resort (美麗灣渡假村)... by flouting the law and the rights of Aboriginals.”  The New Power Party cited Huang’s role in promoting Miramar Resort as well as “his alleged acceptance of fees from pharmaceutical firms when he was a legislator and other legal disputes.”

In response, Huang held a press conference, where he announced: “If the KMT doesn’t support my nomination, I will withdraw from the party.” He then thanked President Tsai for her trust in him, saying he sought the position because “the Control Yuan exercises independent power beyond all party affiliations, and this is a role where I could do something for the nation and for society.”  Following continued opposition, the next day Huang announced he had decided to withdraw from the nomination.

Later political career
Huang's nomination as Secretary-General of the Kuomintang was approved at the 21st National Congress on 30 October 2021.

Personal life
Huang is the son of former Taitung County Magistrate and KMT Internal Affairs Central Commissioner, .

In 1987, Justin Huang married Chen Lien-yen (陳怜燕). As a couple, they are prominent members of the Taiwan Christian community. Chen introduced Huang to Christianity when they met while studying together at Santa Clara University in the 1980s. Huang was baptized by Top Church Pastor, Chang Mao-song (張茂松).

Huang is also the director of the Taitung County Young Workers’ Association, as well as being the founder and chairman of the Healthy Families Cultural and Educational Foundation, and the Taitung Student Parent Foundation.

References

External links

1959 births
Living people
Kuomintang Members of the Legislative Yuan in Taiwan
Santa Clara University School of Business alumni
National Chengchi University alumni
Members of the 5th Legislative Yuan
Members of the 6th Legislative Yuan
Members of the 7th Legislative Yuan
Magistrates of Taitung County
Taitung County Members of the Legislative Yuan